Shadow Man is an album by American composer and saxophonist Tim Berne's band Snakeoil which was released on the ECM label in 2013.

Reception

The Allmusic review by Thom Jurek awarded the album 4 stars and stated "Shadow Man'''s experiment, in trying to capture Snakeoil's live performance in detail and dynamic, is not only successful, it reveals this band at a peak of instinctive, intuitive creativity and imagination".

Writing in The Guardian, John Fordham commented "mingling wide-interval melodies that sometimes sound like contemporary classical music and sometimes trampling funk, quiet solos or intimate duets, tonal contrasts (warm clarinet lyricism, glimmering vibraphones, free-jazz sax wailing), dynamic percussion and unrelenting eventfulness. It's edgy, pattern spinning contemporary music, but austere it certainly is not".

The All About Jazz review by John Kelman said that "Shadow Man is an even more impressive outing from a quartet that, in a career highlighted by strong associations, may well be Berne's most impressively cohesive group yet" while Troy Collins stated "Emboldened by the sterling contributions of Berne's youthful sidemen, Shadow Man surpasses the refined austerity of Snakeoil's debut, providing a far more archetypal example of the protean ensemble's abilities".Collins, T. Shadow Man Review All About Jazz, October 16, 2013

The JazzTimes review by Thomas Conrad enthused "This band’s eponymous ECM debut last year was one of the most acclaimed jazz recordings of 2012. Shadow Man is stronger. It is wilder and deeper, an oceanic extravagance of strange sonic shapes and colors. Yet it coheres according to proprietary logic".

Track listingAll compositions by Tim Berne except as indicated''
 "Son of Not So Sure" - 6:41   
 "Static" (Marc Ducret, Tim Berne) - 8:01   
 "Psalm" (Paul Motian) - 4:14   
 "OC/DC" - 22:55   
 "Socket" - 18:52   
 "Cornered (Duck)" - 16:15

Personnel
Tim Berne - alto saxophone
Oscar Noriega - clarinet, bass clarinet
Matt Mitchell - piano, Tack piano, Wurlitzer electric piano
Ches Smith - drums, percussion, vibraphone

References

ECM Records albums
Tim Berne albums
2013 albums
Albums produced by David Torn